Houria Affak (born 11 July 1988) is an Algerian footballer who plays as a forward.

International career
Affak scored in Algeria's 1–0 win against Ghana at the 2014 African Women's Championship.

References

1988 births
Living people
Algerian women's footballers
Women's association football forwards
Algeria women's international footballers
21st-century Algerian people